Nuvolento is a town and comune in the province of Brescia, in Lombardy. Neighbouring comuni are Paitone, Nuvolera, Prevalle, Serle and Bedizzole. It is within the agricultural area of the province of Brescia, west of the river Chiese and Lake Garda.

References

Cities and towns in Lombardy